Dong Fang Hong 1, in the western world also known as China 1 or PRC 1, was the first space satellite of the People's Republic of China (PRC), launched successfully on 24 April 1970 as part of the PRC's Dongfanghong space satellite program. It was a part of the "Two Bombs, One Satellite" program. At , it was heavier than the first satellites of other countries. The satellite carried a radio transmitter which broadcast the de facto national anthem of the same name. The broadcast lasted for 20 days while in orbit.

It was developed under the direction of Qian Xuesen, dean of the China Academy of Space Technology (CAST). At the time, a total of five identical satellites were created. The first satellite launched successfully. The academy formulated a "Three-Satellite Plan" consisting of Dongfanghong 1, re-entry satellites, and geosynchronous orbit communications satellites. Sun Jiadong was responsible for the Dongfanghong 1 technology. In 1967, Dang Hongxin chose a copper antenna membrane that resolved the difficulties of broadcasting on an ultra-short wave antenna between 100 °C and −100 °C. Engineers installed a music player playing "The East is Red" on the satellite.

Launch 

While Dongfanghong 1 was transported to the launch site by train, armed guards were placed between every two electricity poles. On 24 April 1970, at 13:35:45 GMT, a Long March 1 (CZ-1) lifted off from the Jiuquan Satellite Launch Center, placing the Dongfanghong 1 satellite in orbit at 13:48 GMT.

Objectives 
The primary purpose of the Dong Fang Hong 1 satellite was to perform tests of satellite technology and take readings of the ionosphere and atmosphere.

Satellite design 
It spun 120 times per minute for stabilization. The outer surface was coated with a processed aluminum alloy for temperature control. The main body of the sphere had four ultrashortwave whip antennas of at least  in length. The lower section was connected to a stage containing a rocket motor. It had a shiny metallic ring added to the bottom, with brightness magnitude from +5 to +8.

Orbit 
This near-Earth elliptical orbit has an orbital period of 114.09 minutes. It has Satellite Catalog Number 04382 and International Designator 1970-034A.

Dong Fang Hong 1 had a design life of 20 days. During that time, it transmitted telemetry data and space readings to the Earth. On 14 May 1970, its signal stopped.

Reaction 
With the successful launch of Dong Fang Hong 1, China became the fifth country after the Soviet Union, United States, France, and Japan to independently launch a satellite. Although Dong Fang Hong 1 was launched nearly 13 years after Sputnik I, its mass exceeded the combined masses of the first satellites of the other four countries. After this launch, Qian Xuesen proposed to the Chinese government that China should develop a manned space program and submitted a manned space undertaking report to which Mao Zedong personally approved.

On 21 April 2005, the Chinese Academy of Space Technology gathered the science and technology personnel who participated in the design, manufacture, production, and supervision of Dong Fang Hong 1. The birthplace of Dong Fang Hong 1, the Beijing Satellite Manufacturing Plant, was used as a monument. The manufacturing plant, in coordination with the Shenzhou 5 manned spacecraft anniversary, created a 1:1 scale replica of the Dong Fang Hong 1 satellite. It was exhibited in the Beijing Planetarium.

See also 

 Two Bombs, One Satellite
 Timeline of artificial satellites and space probes

References 

Spacecraft launched in 1970
Satellites of China
Satellites orbiting Earth
1970 in China
First artificial satellites of a country